Equatorial Guinea competed at the 2010 Summer Youth Olympics, the inaugural Youth Olympic Games, held in Singapore from 14 August to 26 August 2010.

Medalists

Athletics

Boys
Track and Road Events

Girls
Track and Road Events

Football

Girls

Group B

Semi-finals

Final

References

External links
Competitors List: Equatorial Guinea – Singapore 2010 official site

Youth
Nations at the 2010 Summer Youth Olympics
Equatorial Guinea at the Youth Olympics